Winchester College is a public school (fee-charging private boarding school) with some provision for day pupils, in Winchester, Hampshire, England. It was founded by William of Wykeham in 1382 for New College, Oxford, and has existed in its present location ever since. It is the oldest of the nine schools considered by the Clarendon Commission. The school has begun the transition to become co-educational and has accepted day pupils from September 2022, having previously been a boys' boarding school for over 600 years.

The school was founded to provide an education for 70 scholars. Gradually numbers rose, a choir of 16 "quiristers" being added alongside paying pupils known as "commoners". Numbers expanded greatly in the 1860s with the addition of ten boarding houses. The scholars continue to live in the school's medieval buildings, which consist of two courtyards, a chapel, and a cloisters. A Wren-style classroom building named "School" was added in the 17th century. An art school ("museum"), science school, and music school were added at the turn of the 20th century. A war cloister was built as a memorial in 1924.

The school has maintained traditions including its mascot, the Trusty Servant; a set of "notions" forming a sort of private language; and a school song, Domum. Its headmasters have included the bishops William Waynflete in the 15th century and George Ridding in the 19th century. Former pupils are known as Old Wykehamists.

History 

Winchester College was founded in 1382 by William of Wykeham, Bishop of Winchester and Chancellor to both Edward III and Richard II, and the first 70 poor scholars entered the school in 1394. In the early 15th century the specific requirement was that scholars come from families where the income was less than five marks sterling (£3 6s 8d) per annum; in comparison, the contemporary reasonable living for a yeoman was £5 per annum.  It was founded in conjunction with New College, Oxford, for which it was designed to act as a feeder: the buildings of both colleges were designed by master mason William Wynford. This double foundation was the model for Eton College and King's College, Cambridge, some 50 years later.

At first only a small number of pupils other than scholars were admitted; by the 15th century the school had around 100 pupils in total, nominally the 70 scholars, 16 choirboys known as "quiristers", and the rest "commoners". Demand for places for commoners was high, and though at first restricted, numbers gradually rose. From the 1860s, ten boarding houses, each for up to sixty pupils, were added, greatly increasing the school's capacity. By 2020, the number of pupils had risen to 690. From 2022, the school has accepted day pupils in the Sixth Form, including girls.

Buildings 

The college consists of an assemblage of buildings from medieval times to the present day. There are 94 listed buildings, set in grounds of some 250 acres, of which 100 acres are water meadows, 52 acres are playing fields, and 11 acres are formal gardens; the area includes St Catherine's Hill. The medieval buildings, representing most of the original foundation from the school's opening in 1394, include Outer Gate and Outer Court, Chamber Court, the chapel, and the Cloisters. These are built in flint with limestone facings and slate roofs. The chapel retains its original wooden fan-vaulted ceiling, designed by Hugh Herland, carpenter to Richard II. Little of the original medieval glass, designed by Thomas Glazier, survives, as it was scattered in the 1820s, but some is now housed in Thurburn's Chantry, at the back of the chapel, and in Fromond's Chantry, inside the Cloisters. The "School" building was constructed in 1683–1687 in Wren style, with a statue of the founder above the door by C. G. Cibber. The school was greatly extended in the 19th century with the addition of boarding houses for "commoners", paying pupils, as opposed to the scholars who continued to live in the medieval College. At the turn of the 20th century, a Music School, "Museum" (art school), and Science School, all architect-designed, were added. A hall big enough for the enlarged school, New Hall, was opened in 1961, accommodating the oak panelling removed from the Chapel in the 1874 refurbishment. In 1924, a War Cloister was constructed; it now serves as a memorial of the Wykehamists killed in the two World Wars. Visitors may tour areas such as Chamber Court, the Chapel, College Hall, the Cloisters, School and Museum, for a fee.

Accommodation

College 

The seventy scholars live in the original buildings, known as "College". The scholars are known as "Collegemen", and the schoolmaster in charge of them is called the Master in College. Collegemen wear black gowns, following the founding traditions of the school. Collegemen enjoy certain privileges compared to the Commoners, such as having open fires and being allowed to walk across Meads, the field outside School.

Boarding houses 

Every pupil at Winchester, apart from the Scholars, lives in a boarding house, chosen or allocated when applying to Winchester. It is here that he studies, eats and sleeps. Each house is presided over by a housemaster (who takes on the role in addition to teaching duties), assisted by house tutors. Houses compete against each other in school sports. Each house has an official name, usually based on the family name of the first housemaster, which is used mainly as a postal address. Each house also has an informal name, usually based on the name or nickname of an early housemaster. Each house also has a letter, in the order of their founding, to act as an abbreviation, especially on laundry tags. A member of a house is described by the informal name of the house with "-ite" suffixed, as "a Furleyite", "a Toyeite", "a Cookite" and so on. College does not have an informal name, although the abbreviation Coll is sometimes used; "X" (meaning, not one of the boarding houses) was originally used only on laundry tags.

Academic

Admission 

Winchester has its own entrance examination, and does not use Common Entrance like other major public schools. Those wishing to enter a Commoner House make their arrangements with the relevant housemaster some two years before sitting the exam, usually sitting a test set by the housemaster and an interview. Those applying to College do not take the normal entrance examination but instead sit a separate, harder, exam called "Election": successful candidates may obtain, according to their performance, a scholarship, an exhibition or a Headmaster's nomination to join a Commoner House. Admission to College was historically coupled to remission of fees, but this has ceased; instead, means-tested bursaries of from 5% to 100% of the school fee are provided, according to need. From 2022, Winchester admitted girls into the 6th form (year 12) as day pupils, with girls boarding from 2024. For 2022/23, the fee is £45,936 per annum (£15,312 per term) for boarding pupils and £33,990 per annum (£11,330 per term) for day pupils.

Structure 

In addition to normal lessons, all boys throughout the school are required to attend a class called Division (known as "Div") which explores parts of history, literature, and politics that do not lead to external examinations; its purpose is to ensure a broad education.

From year 9, pupils study for at least nine GCSE and IGCSEs. Every pupil studies English, mathematics, Latin, French or German, and at least two sciences at this level, as well as "Div". Pupils then study three A-levels, "Div", and an Extended Project Qualification.

Results 
Winchester College is particularly known for its academic rigour. At A-Level, 41.7% of grades achieved were graded A*, and 76.3% of grades achieved were graded A* or A in 2022. 80.3% of GCSEs were graded 8 or 9 (A* equivalent), and 91.2% of grades achieved were graded 7, 8 or 9 (A*/A equivalent). Between 2010 and 2018, an average of 33% of leavers obtained places at Oxford or Cambridge.

Activities

Sport 

Winchester College has its own game, Winchester College football (also known as "Win: Co: Fo:" or "Winkies"), played only at Winchester. It is played in the spring term with a competition between the school's houses; it is largely managed by the boys.

A distinctive Winchester version of fives resembles Rugby fives but with a buttress on the court. The buttress enables a skilful player to cause the ball to ricochet in an unexpected direction.

The school has an active rowing club called the Winchester College Boat Club which is based on the River Itchen. The club is affiliated to British Rowing (boat code WIN) and was twice winner of the Princess Elizabeth Challenge Cup (in 1949 and 1954) at the Henley Royal Regatta.

Rivalry - particularly sporting - between  Winchester and  Eton has existed for centuries.

Combined Cadet Force 

Pupils of the school in their second year are currently required to serve in the college's Combined Cadet Force.

The organisation was founded in 1860 as "The Winchester College Rifle Volunteer Corps" by various boys in their top year as a result of the perceived threat of Napoleon III after the Orsini plot, and remained entirely autonomous until it was taken over by the Second Master in 1868. It was enrolled as a Cadet Corps in the 1st Hants Volunteer Battalion. In 1908, the Officer Training Corps was established, and by 1914, through the request of the War Office that Senior Cadets be given appropriate training for the war effort, almost every student became involved in the Corps, though it was never explicitly compulsory. In the Second World War, it was renamed as "The Junior Training Corps", though its function was still to prepare boys for Officer responsibilities. Montgomery remarked on inspecting the Corps in 1946 that there was "latent leadership in all ranks". In 1948, the "Junior Training Corps" became known as the "Combined Cadet Force" (CCF) which incorporated RAF and RN sections. In 1963, "Alternative Service Activities" were introduced for boys who did not want to join the CCF. Pupils were made eligible to opt out of the CCF at the end of their second year after starting at the beginning of the year: this is still the school's policy.

Traditions

The Trusty Servant: the School Mascot 

The Trusty Servant is an emblematic figure in a painting at Winchester College, that serves as the school's unofficial mascot and the name of its alumni magazine. A painting of The Trusty Servant and accompanying verses both devised by the poet John Hoskins in 1579 hangs outside the college kitchen. The current version was painted by William Cave the Younger in 1809. The painting depicts a mythical creature with the body of a man, the head of a pig, with its snout closed with a padlock, the ears of an ass, the feet of a stag, and tools in his left hand. The verses are on the virtues that pupils of the college were supposed to have. The college arms are shown in the background of the painting.

Notions: the School Language 

A notion is a specialised term peculiar to Winchester College. The word notion is also used to describe traditions unique to the school. An example of a notion is "toytime", meaning homework, from the notion "toys", a wooden cubicle that serves as a pupil's workspace in a communal room, known as "mugging hall" in Commoner Houses or a "chamber" in College.

Manners makyth man: the School motto 

Since the foundation, Winchester College has had numerous words and phrases directly associated with it, including its motto, its graces, and a prayer. A grace is read before and after every lunch and formal meal in College Hall. Two separate graces are traditionally sung during Election, the scholarship process.

Manners makyth man
– Motto of Winchester College, New College, Oxford, and the founder of the two colleges, William of Wykeham

The Latin grace before meals in College goes:

The Latin grace after meals in College goes:

Domum: the school song 

The school song is entitled "Domum" and is sung at the end of the summer term, known as Cloister Time. The origin of the song is unknown; it was described as "an old tradition" in the 1773 History and Antiquities of Winchester. 
The traditional tune was composed by John Reading. A new tune, by Malcolm Archer, was officially adopted by the school in about 2007.

According to legend, the text was written in the 17th century by a pupil who was confined for misconduct during the Whitsun holidays. (In one account, he was tied to a pillar.) It is said that he carved the words on the bark of a tree, which was thereafter called "Domum Tree", and cast himself into Logie (the river running through the school grounds). There is still a "Domum Cottage" in that area. The author of the text apparently wrongly treated domum as a neuter noun.

A "Domum Dinner" is held at the end of the summer term for leavers. It was formerly restricted to those former scholars of Winchester who were also scholars of New College, and distinguished guests. Until the reforms of the 19th century, there were three successive Election Dinners held during Election Week, culminating in a Domum Ball. Originally these festivities occurred around Whitsun, as suggested by references in the song to early summer such as "See the year, the meadow, smiling" and "Now the swallow seeks her dwelling".

Southern Railway V (Schools) Class Locomotive No. 901 

As with other prominent public schools, a locomotive of the Southern Railway V Class was named after Winchester College. The second of the class, No. 901 Winchester was constructed by Southern at the nearby Eastleigh Works; it entered service in 1930. It was selected by the railway's new chief mechanical engineer Oliver Bulleid for rebuilding with a Lemaître multiple-jet blastpipe and wide-diameter chimney from 1939 onwards. Upon passing into British Railways ownership in 1948, it was renumbered 30901. It was withdrawn from service in 1962.

Headmasters 

The headmasters of Winchester College from the 14th century onwards are:

Former pupils 

Current pupils of Winchester College are known as Wykehamists, in memory of the school's founder, William of Wykeham; former pupils are known as Old Wykehamists, or amongst themselves as Old Woks. 
Fictional Old Wykehamists appear in over 50 novels, starting with Tobias Smollett's eponymous Peregrine Pickle in 1751.

Controversy 

In 1872, under the headmaster George Ridding, "tunding", beatings given by a prefect (a senior pupil), using a ground-ash across the shoulders, were still permitted. The matter became a national scandal, known as "the Tunding Row", when "an overzealous Senior Commoner Prefect" beat a pupil for refusing to attend a notions test. Ridding made matters worse by trying to defend the action. He eventually limited the prefects' power to beat, and forbade notions tests as a "disgraceful innovation".

The college knew in 1982 of allegations of sadomasochistic abuse of boys and young men attending summer camps run by the Iwerne Trust in the 1970s, "to ensure that future members of the establishment were committed Christians". These were known as "Bash camps" after the nickname of their founder, E. J. H. Nash. Neither the college nor the Trust reported these bare-buttocks beatings to the police. The perpetrator, John Smyth QC, now deceased, was warned off and moved to Zimbabwe and then South Africa where abuse continued. An independent review into the abuse, commissioned by the college, was published in January 2022.

In 2005, Winchester College was one of fifty of the country's leading independent schools found guilty of running an unlawful price-fixing cartel by the Office of Fair Trading. As a penalty, the schools paid for a trust fund to benefit the affected pupils. Winchester College, like Eton, received a fifty percent reduction in its penalty in return for its full cooperation.

In 2017 Winchester College suspended a member of the staff for providing students with information about questions on an upcoming public exam. The headmaster of Winchester confirmed that the school had treated the matter "very seriously" and that no boy was responsible for the "exam irregularity". The information was widely distributed, resulting in their papers being disallowed.

See also 

 New College School
 Papyrus Oxyrhynchus 80

References

Further reading 

 Adams, Henry C., Wykehamica: A History of Winchester College, Oxford, London and Winchester: James Parker, 1878
 Cook, Arthur K.; Mathew, Robert, About Winchester College, London: Macmillan, 1917
 Custance, Roger, (ed.), Winchester College: Sixth Centenary Essays, Oxford: Oxford University Press, 1982 
 Dilke, Christopher, Dr Moberly's Mint-Mark: A Study of Winchester College, London: Heinemann, 1965
 Fearon, William A., The Passing of Old Winchester: Winchester: Winchester College, 1924
 Firth, J. D'E., Winchester College, Winchester: Winchester Publications, 1949
 Kirby, T. F., Annals of Winchester College, London and Winchester: Henry Frowde, 1892
 Leach, Arthur F., A History of Winchester College, London: Duckworth, 1899 (Review)
 Mansfield, Robert, School Life at Winchester College, London: John Camden Hotten, 1866
 Rich, Edward J. G. H., Recollections of the Two St. Mary Winton Colleges, Walsall and London: Edward Rich, 1883
 
 Stevens, Charles, Winchester Notions: The English Dialect of Winchester College, London: Athlone Press, 1998
 Tuckwell, William, The Ancient Ways: Winchester Fifty Years Ago, London: Macmillan, 1893
 
 Walcott, Mackenzie E. C., William of Wykeham and his Colleges, London: David Nutt, 1852 
 Wordsworth, Charles, The College of St Mary Winton near Winchester, Oxford and London: J. H. Parker, 1848

External links 

 
 

 
1382 establishments in England
Boarding schools in Hampshire
Boys' schools in Hampshire
Charities based in Hampshire
Church of England private schools in the Diocese of Winchester
Cricket in Hampshire
Educational institutions established in the 14th century
English cricket in the 14th to 17th centuries
Exempt charities
Private schools in Hampshire
Member schools of the Headmasters' and Headmistresses' Conference
Organisations based in Hampshire with royal patronage
Racquets venues
Schools cricket
College